3288 Seleucus, provisional designation , is a rare-type stony asteroid, classified as near-Earth object of the Amor group of asteroids, approximately 2.5 kilometers in diameter. It was discovered on 28 February 1982, by German astronomer Hans-Emil Schuster at ESO's La Silla Observatory site in northern Chile. It was named after the Hellenistic general and Seleucid ruler Seleucus I Nicator.

Orbit 

Seleucus orbits the Sun in the inner main-belt at a distance of 1.1–3.0 AU once every 2 years and 11 months (1,059 days). Its orbit has an eccentricity of 0.46 and an inclination of 6° with respect to the ecliptic. As no precoveries were taken, and no prior identifications were made, the body's observation arc begins with its official discovery observation at La Silla.

Physical parameters

Spectral type 

On the Tholen and SMASS taxonomic scheme, Seleucus is classified as a featureless S-type and rare K-type asteroid, respectively.

Rotation period 

It has a relatively long rotation period of 75 hours with a brightness variation of 1.0 magnitude, indicative of a non-spheroidal shape. While most minor planets have spin rate between 2 and 20 hours, Seleucus still rotates faster than a typical slow rotator, which have periods above 100 hours.

Diameter and albedo 

According to the survey carried out by NASA's Wide-field Infrared Survey Explorer with its subsequent NEOWISE mission, Seleucus measures 2.49 and 2.83 kilometers in diameter, and its surface has an albedo of 0.139 and 0.24, respectively. The Collaborative Asteroid Lightcurve Link adopts an albedo of 0.23 and a diameter of 2.2 kilometers, based on modeled data by Alan Harris.

Naming 

This minor planet is named for Seleucus I Nicator, a general in the army of Alexander the Great, and, after the death of Alexander, founder and king of the Seleucid Empire. The approved naming citation was published by the Minor Planet Center on 29 September 1985.

See also 
 Seleucus (crater), a lunar crater

References

External links 
 Asteroid Lightcurve Database (LCDB), query form (info )
 Dictionary of Minor Planet Names, Google books
 Asteroids and comets rotation curves, CdR – Observatoire de Genève, Raoul Behrend
 
 
 

003288
Discoveries by Hans-Emil Schuster
Named minor planets
003288
003288
19820228